The Law of the 45's (also known as The Mysterious Mr. Sheffield in the United Kingdom) is a 1935 American Western film directed by John P. McCarthy.  The screenplay was based on the 1933 novel of the same name by William Colt MacDonald. It was the first film to be made of MacDonald's characters The Three Mesquiteers, that later became a film series at Republic Pictures. Though only two of the characters, Tucson and Stoney, appeared in this film, Williams would appear as the missing member "Lullaby" Joslyn in Powdersmoke Range shot in the same year for RKO.

Previously the Alexander brothers Arthur Alexander and Max Alexander had released a series of Westerns starring Guinn Williams under their Beacon Pictures company.  Law of the 45s was made by Max's Normandy Pictures.

Plot
Tucson Smith and Stoney Martin are driving a herd of cattle to sell when they come into saving Charlie Hayden from a gang of killers.  Tucson and Stoney sell their cattle to Hayden and agree to work for him, both as range hands and to stops the gang of killers hired from Mexico. Tucson explains that there are two laws; when the regular law is nowhere to be found, the law of  the 45's takes over.

C 
Guinn 'Big Boy' Williams as Tucson "Two-Gun" Smith
Molly O'Day as Joan Hayden
Al St. John as Stoney Martin
Ted Adams as Gordon Rontell
Lafe McKee as Charlie Hayden (Joan's Father)
Fred Burns as Sheriff Tom
Curley Baldwin as Deputy Bill
Martin Garralaga as Joe Sanchez (Rontell's Gunman)
Broderick O'Farrell as Sir Henry Sheffield
James Sheridan as Henchman Toral
Glenn Strange as Monte (Hayden Wrangler)

Notes

External links 

1935 films
American black-and-white films
Films based on American novels
1935 Western (genre) films
American Western (genre) films
1930s English-language films
1930s American films